The Mary River turtle (Elusor macrurus) is an endangered short-necked turtle that is endemic to the Mary River in south-east Queensland, Australia. Although these turtles were known to inhabit the Mary River for nearly 30 years, it was not until 1994 that they were recognised as a new species. There has been a dramatic decrease in their population due to low reproduction rates and an increase of depredation on nests.

Taxonomy
The Mary River turtle was first formally described in 1994. The first name the Mary River Turtle was given was Elseya latisternum, meaning saw-shelled turtle. The Mary River Turtle can also be called the Punk Turtle, due to the algae that grows on its head or shell. Elusor is a monotypic genus representing a very old lineage of turtles that has all but disappeared from the evolutionary history of Australia.

Description

The Mary River turtle is one of Australia's largest turtles. Specimens in excess of 50 cm in carapace length have been recorded. Hatchlings have a straight carapace length of 2.0–3.5 cm. Adult Mary River turtles have an elongated, streamlined carapace that can be plain in colour or intricately patterned. Overall colour can vary from rusty red to brown and almost black. The plastron varies from cream to pale pink. The skin colouration is similar to that of the shell and often has salmon pink present on the tail and limbs. The iris can be pale blue. Mary River turtles use bimodal respiration, and so are capable of absorbing oxygen via the cloaca whilst underwater, because of this, they can stay under the water for three days at a time. However, they do regularly come to the surface to breathe air in the usual way. A unique feature of the male Mary River turtle is the tail, which can measure almost two-thirds of the carapace length.  The tail has haemal arches, a feature lost in all other modern turtles. It is probably a derived feature, but its function is not understood. Another unique feature is the exceptionally long barbels under the mandible. Proportionately, the Mary River turtle has the smallest head and largest hind feet of all the species within the catchment, which contributes to its distinction of being the fastest swimmer.

The turtle is occasionally informally referred to as the green haired turtle due to the fact that many specimens are covered with growing strands of algae which resemble hair. It is also sometimes referred to as the bum-breathing turtle due to its cloaca.

Threats 
The Mary River Turtle experiences many threats. Predation of hatchlings occurs by red foxes, wild dogs, and fish, especially when the turtles are at the hatchling and juvenile stages of their life. Their number one threat is the looting of their nests by dogs, foxes, and goannas. The land around the Mary River has been cleared many times leading to low quality water and a build up of silt. Invasive plants along the river bank have also contributed to the lack of breeding success because they make it difficult for Mary River Turtles to go ashore and lay their eggs. 

The Mary River Turtle has the ability to blend into muddy waters and wait for unsuspecting prey to pass. Their algae cover shell also allows them to stay hidden from predators.

Ecology
Little is known about the ecology and behaviour of the Mary River Turtle. They inhabit flowing and well-oxygenated sections of the Mary River basin from Gympie to Maryborough, using terrestrial nest sites. Their habitats consists of riffles and shallow parts that alternate with deeper pools.They prefer to inhabit clear and slow moving water. Turtles take an unusually long time to mature; it has been estimated that females take 25 years, and males, 30 years to become adults. Mature males may be aggressive towards other males, or turtles of other species. The species are omnivorous, taking plant matter such as algae as well as bivalves and other small animal prey, such as fish, frogs, and sometimes even ducklings.

Conservation
In the 1960s and 1970s, the Mary River turtle was popular as a pet in Australia, with about 15,000 sent to shops every year during a 10-year period. They were originally known as the "penny turtle" or "pet shop turtle".

This species is currently listed as endangered under Queensland's Nature Conservation Act 1992, and under the federal Environment Protection and Biodiversity Conservation Act 1999.  The international conservation body IUCN lists it as endangered on the IUCN Red List. It is also listed on the Zoological Society of London's Evolutionarily Distinct and Globally Endangered list, part of the EDGE of Existence programme. The Mary River Turtle has also secured 30th place on the ZSL's Evolutionary Distinct and Globally Endangered list for reptiles. It is Australia's most endangered freshwater turtle species. The Mary River Turtle was the second-most endangered freshwater turtle after the western swamp turtle (Pseudemydura umbrina) of Western Australia.  Mary River turtles were listed amongst the world's top 25 most endangered turtle species by the Turtle Conservation Fund in 2003.

Australia's first reptile-focused, nonprofit conservation organization, the Australian Freshwater Turtle Conservation and Research Association, were the first to breed this species in captivity for release into the wild in 2007. A purpose-built hatchery was built along the banks of the Mary River in 2019/2020. This hatchery was built to install nests and it is planned to be used in the future in order to grow the Mary River Turtle population.

See also

List of Nature Conservation Act endangered fauna of Queensland

References

External links

AFTCRA Inc. The Australian Freshwater Turtle Conservation and Research Association
Mary River Turtle – Tiaro & District Landcare Group QLD
Gympie Land Care
Amonline
www.qm.qld.gov.au/features/endangered/animals/river_turtle.asp
Image of the Mary River turtle

Turtles of Australia
EPBC Act endangered biota
Nature Conservation Act endangered biota
Elusor
Mary River (Queensland)
Pets in Australia
Reptiles described in 1994
EDGE species
Endangered fauna of Australia